Gateway High School is a charter school located in San Francisco, California. It was founded in September 1998. For many years it resided in the Sunset District at Laguna Honda before moving to its permanent location, at the corner of Geary and Scott, in the building that formerly housed Benjamin Franklin Middle School. The building is also shared with the KIPP SF Bay Academy, a 5-8th grade charter school.

Gateway focuses on small class sizes, high standards, and a close student-to-faculty relationship. The school has been designated as a California Distinguished School and as a 21st Century School of Distinction. It has also been officially nominated by the United States Department of Education in December 2006 as one of eight acclaimed charter schools in the nation. As of September 2017, it is the third highest ranked public school in English standardized testing scores San Francisco, and in June 2009, Newsweek ranked it as one of "America's Top Public High Schools" .

Education 
Gateway runs as a college preparatory, liberal arts education high school. In their first year, freshmen take an introductory seminar course. Students are required to take 2 years of art, compared to the normal 1 year required by California Third Level Institutions. Students are expected to fulfill their own PE requirement, however PE classes are offered. A number of Posse Scholars have attended Gateway.

Demographics

According to U.S. News & World Report, 74% of Gateway's student body is "of color," with 40% of the student body coming from an economically disadvantaged household, determined by student eligibility for California's Reduced-price meal program.

Notable people

Marcus Orelias, entertainer and entrepreneur. (2012)
Shawn Spikes, jockey. (2013)

See also
San Francisco County high schools
Aim High Academy

References

External links 
Gateway High School, official website

High schools in San Francisco
Educational institutions established in 1998
Charter high schools in California
1998 establishments in California